Sára Pusztai (born 16 November 2001) is a Hungarian footballer who plays as a midfielder for Női NB I club Ferencvárosi TC and the Hungary women's national team.

International goals

References

2001 births
Living people
Women's association football midfielders
Hungarian women's footballers
Hungary women's international footballers
Ferencvárosi TC (women) footballers